Douroula is a town in Burkina Faso. It is the county seat of Douroula Department in the  province Mouhoun.

Near the town are ruins of a smelting furnace and evidence of ferrous metallurgy dating back to the 8th century BC. This is the oldest confirmed metallurgy site in Burkina Faso discovered to date. Because of this, on 5 July 2019, Douroula was inscribed along with other ancient metallurgy complexes Tiwêga, Yamané, Kindibo and Békuy on the UNESCO World Heritage List as part of the Ancient Ferrous Metallurgy Sites of Burkina Faso.

References

Populated places in the Boucle du Mouhoun Region
World Heritage Sites in Burkina Faso
Archaeological sites of Western Africa